16th OTO Awards

SND, Bratislava, Slovakia

Overall winner  Adela Banášová

Hall of Fame Emil Horváth

Život Award Michal Kubovčík

◄ 15th | 17th ►

The 16th OTO Awards honoring the best in Slovak popular culture for the year 2015, took time and place on March 12, 2016 at the former Opera building of the Slovak National Theater in Bratislava. The ceremony was broadcast live the channel Jednotka of RTVS. The hosts of the upcoming show were for the fourth consecutive time, Adela Banášová and Matej "Sajfa" Cifra.

Schedule

Nominees

Main categories
 Television

 Music

Others

Superlatives
Having two simultaneous winning nominations, Marcel Merčiak has become the first participant of the TV poll to achieve it.

References

External links
 OTO 2015 – 16th edition  (Official website)

OTO Awards
2015 in Slovak music
2015 in Slovak television
2015 television awards